Semaphore was an electoral district of the House of Assembly in the Australian state of South Australia from 1938 to 1993.

Semaphore was abolished in a boundary redistribution in 1993 and became the new seat of Hart.

The suburb of Semaphore is currently located in the marginal Labor seat of Lee.

Members

Election results

References

External links
1985 & 1989 election boundaries, page 18 & 19

Former electoral districts of South Australia
1938 establishments in Australia
1993 disestablishments in Australia
Constituencies established in 1938
Constituencies disestablished in 1993